Desulfovibrio marrakechensis is a bacterium. It is sulfate-reducing and tyrosol-oxidising. Its cells are mesophilic, non-spore-forming, non-motile, Gram-negative, catalase-positive and straight-rod-shaped. They contain cytochrome c(3) and desulfoviridin. The type strain is EMSSDQ(4)(T) (=DSM 19337(T) =ATCC BAA-1562(T)).

References

Further reading
Staley, James T., et al. "Bergey's manual of systematic bacteriology, vol. 3."Williams and Wilkins, Baltimore, MD (1989): 2250–2251. *Bélaich, Jean-Pierre, Mireille Bruschi, and Jean-Louis Garcia, eds. Microbiology and biochemistry of strict Anaerobes Involved in interspecies hydrogen transfer. No. 54. Springer, 1990.

External links
LPSN

Type strain of Desulfovibrio marrakechensis at BacDive -  the Bacterial Diversity Metadatabase

Desulfovibrio

Bacteria described in 2009